Kámen is a municipality and village in Pelhřimov District in the Vysočina Region of the Czech Republic. It has about 300 inhabitants.

Administrative parts
Villages of Nízká Lhota and Nový Dvůr are administrative parts of Kámen.

Geography
It lies in the Křemešník Highlands. There are several ponds in the municipality.

History
The first written mention of Kámen is from 1316. The oldest part of the local castle was founded in the mid-13th century. The estate was owned by the royal chamber and granted to various nobles and court officials. In 1366, Jindřich of Ciglheim established gold mines here. The estate was owned by the royal chamber until 1504. The most important owners of Kámen were the Malovec of Malovice family, who held it from 1523 until the beginning of the 18th century.

Sights
Kámen is known for the Kámen Castle. It is a medieval castle, which was rebuilt and extended in the 16th and 17th centuries. Today the castle is opened to the public and offers sightseeing tours. It is administered by the Vysočina Museum in Jihlava.

The Chapel of Our Lady of Sorrows was built in 1667–1671. It is a valuable early Baroque chapel.

References

External links

Villages in Pelhřimov District